Staryye Chupty (İśke Suptı) is a rural locality (a village) in Chekmagushevsky District, Bashkortostan, Russia. The population was 16 as of 2010. There is 1 street.

Geography 
Staryye Chupty is located 10 km northwest of Chekmagush (the district's administrative centre) by road. Bikmetovo is the nearest rural locality.

References 

Rural localities in Chekmagushevsky District